Bavli, or Shikun Bavli, is a neighborhood in central Tel Aviv, Israel, named after the Babylonian Talmud, and bounded by Hayarkon Park on the north, Ayalon highway to the east, Namir road to the west, and Park Tzameret to the south.

History
Shikun Bavli was founded in 1957, and developed rapidly over the 1970s and 1980s. Due to its proximity to both the city center and the park, it is considered a mostly upper middle class neighborhood, with a majority of older couples and families living within the area. The Jerusalem Post has called Bavli "one of the most iconic quarters of Tel Aviv", due in part to its enclosed nature.

On its eastern border, the Ayalon River flows through an artificial channel along the Ayalon Freeway, diverted from its natural bed as a preventive measure against floods. It used to flow into the Mediterranean Sea north of Jaffa, but now, it discharges into the Yarkon River at the northeastern corner of the Bavli Quarter.

References

Neighborhoods of Tel Aviv
Upper middle class